The 2015 ABN AMRO World Tennis Tournament (or Rotterdam Open) was a men's tennis tournament played on indoor hard courts. It took place at the Rotterdam Ahoy arena in the Dutch city of Rotterdam, between 9–15 February 2015. It was the 42nd edition of the Rotterdam Open, whose official name is the ABN AMRO World Tennis Tournament. The competition was part of the ATP World Tour 500 series of the 2015 ATP World Tour. Stan Wawrinka won the singles.

Points and prize money

Point distribution

Prize money 

1 Qualifiers prize money is also the Round of 32 prize money
* per team

Singles main-draw entrants

Seeds 

1 Rankings as of February 2, 2015.

Other entrants 
The following players received wildcards into the main draw:
 Robin Haase
 Jesse Huta Galung
 Alexander Zverev

The following players received entry from the qualifying draw:
 Andrey Kuznetsov
 Nicolas Mahut
 Paul-Henri Mathieu
 Édouard Roger-Vasselin

The following player received entry as a lucky loser:
 Tobias Kamke

Withdrawals
Before the tournament
  Marin Čilić → replaced by João Sousa
  Jerzy Janowicz (illness) → replaced by Tobias Kamke
  Jo-Wilfried Tsonga → replaced by Simone Bolelli

Retirements
  Julien Benneteau

Doubles main-draw entrants

Seeds 

1 Rankings are as of February 2, 2015.

Other entrants 
The following pairs received wildcards into the main draw:
 Andre Begemann /  Robin Haase
 Jesse Huta Galung /  Glenn Smits

The following pair received entry from the qualifying draw:
 Colin Fleming /  Jonathan Marray

The following pair received entry as lucky losers:
 Jamie Murray /  John Peers

Withdrawals
During the tournament
  Julien Benneteau

Finals

Singles 

  Stanislas Wawrinka defeated  Tomáš Berdych, 4–6, 6–3, 6–4

Doubles 

  Jean-Julien Rojer /  Horia Tecău defeated  Jamie Murray /  John Peers, 3–6, 6–3, [10–8]

References

External links 
 

 
ABN AMRO World Tennis Tournament
ABN AMRO World Tennis Tournament
ABN AMRO World Tennis Tournament